Jamal Garhi is a small town located 13 kilometers from Mardan at Katlang-Mardan road in Khyber Pakhtunkhwa province in northern Pakistan. Jamal Garhi was a Buddhist monastery from the first until the fifth century AD at a time when Buddhism flourished in this part of the Indian subcontinent. There is a beautiful monastery and main stupa, surrounded by chapels closely packed together. The site is called "The Jamal Garhi Kandarat or Kafiro Kote" by the locals.

Discovery
The ruins of Jamal Garhi were first discovered by the British explorer and archaeologist Sir Alexander Cunningham in 1848. The stupa at the site was opened by Colonel Lumsden in 1852 but little of value was found at the time. In 1871, the site was excavated by Lieutenant Cromten, who unearthed a large number of Buddhist sculptures which are now part of the collections of the British Museum and the Indian Museum in Calcutta.
At the monastery a Kharoshti inscription was also discovered which is now kept in Peshawar Museum.

Ruins

Sculptural remains

See also
Seated Buddha from Gandhara, which was also found at the site.
Ranigat a historical site in Buner near Swabi.

 Takht-i-Bahi

 The frieze of the Buddha and the nude Vajrapani at Jamal Garhi -

References

Populated places in Mardan District
Asian sculptures in the British Museum
Indian Buddhist sculpture
Gandhara